Gatab (also Romanized as Gatāb; also known as Bālā Gatāb, Bālā Ketāb, Gatāb-e Bālā, and Ketāb) is a city and capital of Gatab District, Babol County, Mazandaran Province, Iran.  At the 2006 census, its population was 6,956, in 1,744 families.

References

Populated places in Babol County

Cities in Mazandaran Province